The River Witham is a river almost entirely in the county of Lincolnshire in the east of England. The name "Witham" seems to be extremely old and of unknown origin. Archaeological and documentary evidence shows the importance of the Witham as a navigable river from the Iron Age onwards. From Roman times it was navigable to Lincoln, from where the Fossdyke was constructed to link it to the River Trent. The mouth of the river moved in 1014 following severe flooding, and Boston became important as a port.

From 1142 onwards, sluices were constructed to prevent flooding by the sea, and this culminated in the Great Sluice, which was constructed in 1766. It maintained river levels above Boston, and helped to scour the channel below it. The land through which the lower river runs has been the subject of much land drainage, and many drains are connected to the Witham by flood doors, which block them off if river levels rise rapidly. The river is navigable from Brayford Pool in Lincoln to Boston.  Its locks are at Lincoln, Bardney and the Grand/Great Sluice. Passage through the latter is restricted typically to 4-hour intervals during daylight when the tidal levels are suitable. The river provides access for boaters to the Witham Navigable Drains, to the north of Boston, and to the South Forty-Foot Drain to the south, which was reopened as part of the Fens Waterways Link, a project to link the river to the Nene flowing through the city of Peterborough. From Brayford Pool the Fossdyke Navigation links to the Trent.

Route

The Witham's course, which flows to the north and then to the south-east may be the result of glaciation (and possibly isostatic rebound) redirecting older rivers. After briefly flowing to the east to reach South Witham, it flows generally north, passing through Colsterworth where it is crossed by the A1 road, which largely follows the line of the river to Newark on Trent. At Great Ponton, it is joined by the Cringle Brook on its left bank, and continues through Grantham, where it has already descended to  AOD. After Barkston it turns to the west to pass through Marston. Foston Beck joins on the left bank, and at Long Bennington it resumes its northerly course. The River Brant joins on the right bank, before it passes through North Hykeham to reach Lincoln, where it is only  AOD.

The upper waters are important for agricultural water extraction, and for coarse fish such as roach, common bream and pike; small mammals like water voles, and native crayfish. A gap in the limestone scarp (see Lincolnshire Wolds) near Ancaster may represent an earlier course of the River Trent towards Boston, but is now occupied by the River Slea.

In Lincoln, the river flows into Brayford Pool and exits along a narrow channel that passes under the medieval High Bridge. The bridge not only restricts navigation due to its small size, but the volume of water that can pass through the gap is limited in times of flood. This is alleviated by the Sincil Dyke, which leaves the main channel at Bargate Weir and runs for  through the industrial areas to the south of the main city centre. It used to rejoin the main channel at Stamp End, but was re-routed into the South Delph, a drainage ditch constructed by John Rennie in the early 19th century that joins the main channel below Bardney lock. The origins of the Sincil Dyke are unknown, but it is known to have been used as a drainage channel in the mid-13th century and is thought to be pre-medieval or even Roman. Parts of it were culverted in 1847 to allow the construction of Lincoln Central railway station.

From Lincoln, the river again turns first east, then south, making a cut through a belt of upland known as the Lincoln Gap. This section has also been suggested as a lower course of the Trent during and before periods of glaciation.

From Dogdyke near Coningsby to Boston, the north bank of the river was used by a section of the Great Northern Railway from Lincoln to Boston.
A long-distance footpath, the Water Rail Way, follows the course of the river from Lincoln to Boston. The path uses sections of the river towpath and abandoned railway tracks, and has been opened in stages, with the final  being completed in September 2008. The path is now part of Route 1 of the National Cycle Network and features a number of sculptures along its length, each commissioned from local artists. They include Lincoln longwool sheep at Stixwould, Lincoln Red cows at Washingborough, and Lincoln curly pigs, which became extinct in 1972, at Southrey.

History

The name "Witham" seems to be extremely old, apparently predating Anglo-Saxon, Roman, and even Celtic influence. The meaning is uncertain, although one possibility is Wye-om, meaning river plain, and the river has been known as the Witham since Saxon times. However, it was known as the Grant Avon in Ancient British times, meaning divine stream, and the fact that the main town on the upper river was Grant-ham may support this. John Leland writing in the 16th century noted that it was also called the Lindis, and others referred to it by that name. The present course may be a combination of two rivers, with the upper river originally emptying into Brayford Mere, to the west of Lincoln, and draining along the course of the Fossdyke, while the Langworth River emptied into another mere to the east of Lincoln, located between Washingborough and Chapel Hill. From there, the water flowed along a tidal creek to reach the sea. There was a ridge of high ground between the two meres, and the Romans cut a channel through it as part of some drainage works.

Archaeological evidence points to river navigation as far back as the Iron Age.  Artefacts such as the Iron Age Witham Shield, found in the river near Washingborough in 1826, and the Fiskerton Boat, a log boat found near Fiskerton during flood defence work in 2001 have been recovered and are on display at the British Museum in London or The Collection in Lincoln.

The Witham was an important navigation in Roman times. Lincoln (Lindum)—the meeting point of Ermine Street, joining London to York, and Fosse Way, leading to Leicester and Bath—was an important Roman fort that became one of only four colonia in Britain. Most important Roman cities were situated near navigable water, which enabled goods to be transported in bulk, but Lincoln did not possess this advantage, and so the Romans constructed the Fossdyke from Lincoln to Torksey on the River Trent, improved the River Witham from Lincoln to The Wash, and built the Car Dyke from Lincoln to the River Cam near Cambridge. The Witham thus gave Lincoln access to the east coast, while the Fossdyke gave access to the Trent and further on to the Humber.

There have been claims that the Witham was originally tidal up to Lincoln, but that seems unlikely. Wheeler argues that it "would not have been possible for the tide to flow up to Lincoln," given the present geological conditions.

Trading continued throughout the medieval period evidenced by the importance of Torksey, which was then a flourishing town, now only a small village. However, the Fossdyke needed much maintenance to keep it clear of silt. Henry I had overseen the scouring of its channel, and there were inquiries in 1335, 1365 and 1518 to consider the state of the Fossdyke and to compel the inhabitants of the region to maintain it. Lincoln was a centre for the collection of business taxes, but this came at the cost of maintaining the waterways, and having finally decided it was too large a cost, James I presented the Fossdyke to the City of Lincoln.

The Witham originally flowed into The Wash at Bicker Haven, where the port of Drayton was established in the Welland estuary, and it was only as a result of massive flooding in 1014 that it diverted itself to flow into The Haven at Boston. This gave rise to the growth of Boston as a port in the 12th and 13th centuries, exporting wool and salt to the Hanseatic League, though Boston only received its charter in 1545.

The river was affected by silting which restricted trade despite the construction of various sluices and barriers from 1142 onwards, when the first sluice was built below Boston. Other sluices were erected at Boston in 1500 and at Langrick in 1543, but navigation was again difficult on both the river and the Fossdyke by 1660. In 1671 an Act of Parliament was obtained for the improvement of the Navigation. In 1743, John Grundy, Sr. and his son John Grundy, Jr. were commissioned to produce a detailed survey of the river. They produced an engraved map in 1743 and a printed report, running to 48 pages, in the following year. The main recommendation was a  new cut to eliminate the "prodigious meandering course" of the channel above Boston. Although the estimated cost of £16,200 dissuaded the landowners from taking action at the time, the report formed the basis for improvements in the 1760s.

Canalisation
Following meetings of Landowners held in 1752 and 1753, they asked John Grundy Jr, as his father had died in 1748, to re-evaluate his plans from 1744 and consider a plan for a "Grand Sluice" that had been produced by Daniel Coppin in 1745. Grundy suggested that the 1744 cut should be extended by a further  into Boston, and that the sluice could then be built on the extension. The landowners moved the location of the sluice nearer to Boston, but otherwise approved his report, although no action was taken. John Grundy was again consulted in 1757, and Langley Edwards of King's Lynn was asked to review the positioning of the sluice in 1760. The landowners then asked John Smeaton to liaise with Grundy and Edwards, and the three engineers produced a joint report in 1761, with estimates of £38,000 for drainage works and £7,400 for improvements to navigation. The report was approved, although a meeting held in January 1762 decided that the new cut should revert to the alignment suggested by Grundy in 1753. The location of the Grand Sluice would be as suggested by Edwards in 1760. Grundy produced another engraved map, and parliamentary approval for the works was obtained in June 1762.

Once the Act of Parliament was obtained, Edwards became the engineer for the project, and drew up the detailed plans, which Grundy and Smeaton checked and altered slightly, after which they had no further involvement with the scheme. Construction was started in April 1763, and the drainage element of the project, which included the sluice, was finished in 1768, having cost £42,000. Work on three locks and other work connected with navigation cost £6,000 and continued until 1771. The locks were located at Stamp End, Kirkstead and Barlings. The Grand Sluice was a major construction which maintained the height of water above Boston to near normal high tide level and had massive flood gates to cope with any tides above this. It was completed in 1766 and was effective in scouring the Haven below it and increasing silting of the river above it.

The 1762 act created the Witham Navigation Commissioners and the Witham Drainage General Commissioners, who continued to promote drainage schemes actively, creating a drainage network known as the Witham Navigable Drains that transformed much of northern Lincolnshire from fen to farming land. Today many of these channels are managed by the Witham First, Third and Fourth District Internal Drainage Boards and Upper Witham Internal Drainage Board. These four internal drainage boards reduce the flood risk to the surrounding properties, land and environment.

In 1791, as part of the campaign to promote the construction of the Horncastle Canal, the Commissioners of the River Witham asked the engineer William Jessop to assess the state of the Fossdyke Navigation and the Witham, with particular reference to the problems of navigating through Lincoln, where the channel was restricted by a medieval bridge. The Commissioners had imposed a toll on all traffic passing under the bridge, but decided that a channel bypassing the city would have grave financial consequences. They opted for improving the existing channel and the work to remove the wooden floor, to lower the river bed under the bridge and to underpin its foundations was completed in 1795. The Commissioners dropped the collection of tolls at the bridge, but the amount they received from traffic passing through the locks increased as the volume of traffic grew in response to the easier passage through the bridge.

The Grand Sluice
The lock was originally very small, but was lengthened to its current  in 1881. The pointed doors on the non-tidal side of the sluice were replaced by steel guillotine gates between 1979 and 1982.

Improvements

The state of the Witham had deteriorated by 1802, and the Commissioners asked John Rennie for advice. He stated that the Kirkstead lock was badly placed, and the associated staunch was in danger of collapse. He recommended that it be demolished and rebuilt elsewhere, and also suggested that access to Boston should be through the Witham Navigable Drains, rather than the Grand Sluice, or that a new cut should be built to the south of the sluice, to rejoin the river at Boston Harbour. In 1803, he suggested that High Bridge at Lincoln should be demolished and rebuilt. Four years later, he suggested that the locks at Kirkstead and Barlings should be removed, and replaced by one near Washingborough church. The Commissioners petitioned parliament in 1808, and a new Act of Parliament authorised the work, to be carried out by a company of proprietors. They could borrow £30,000 for the drainage element of the scheme and £70,000 for the navigation element. Two new locks were built, one at Stamp End and the other at Bardney, which replaced the original locks. A new channel was cut near Fiskerton, upstream of Bardney, and the plan for a lock at Washingborough was dropped. While Stamp End lock was being rebuilt, an alternative route was provided, utilising the Sincil Dyke and the South Delph. Rennie recorded that Branston Delph, Carlton Dike, Nocton Delph and Timberland Dike were navigable at the time. The proprietors obtained three more Acts of Parliament, in 1812, 1826 and 1829, all with the main aim of allowing more capital to be raised.

Tolls on the Witham had gradually risen as improvements had been made. £263 was raised in 1763–4, and had reached £898 by 1790. In 1819, income exceeded £4,100 for the six months from March to September, and a five per cent dividend was paid in the following year. By 1826, over £180,000 had been spent on improvements, and another £40,000 was needed. However, the proprietors were still optimistic, and commissioned Sir John Rennie to investigate an extension to link the Witham to the River Ancholme, but although he made two proposals, neither was implemented. Most traffic was carried by sailing vessels in barges hauled by horses, but in March 1816, the first steam packet boat arrived on the river. It was named Witham and had been built by Shuttleworth and Robinson, whose yard was on Sincil Dyke. Despite a boiler explosion in March 1817, fortunately without causing injury to any of the crew or the 30 passengers, a second steam packet was operating by July 1817, and they soon displaced the sailing packet boats. During a flood in 1828, one of them lost power when a floating hedge became jammed in the paddle wheels. In the following year, a Lincoln man, William Pool invented a new type of paddlewheel, which resulted in the boats travelling faster, and in 1836, wooden vessels were superseded by iron packet boats.

Railways reached Lincoln in August 1848, 15 years after the first proposal. The Wakefield, Lincoln and Boston Railway hoped to build railways in the area, and negotiated with the proprietors and those of the Fosdyke. Under the arrangement, they would take over both navigations, and guarantee a fixed income for the proprietors. They would then merge with the London and York Railway. Both proposals had been absorbed into the Great Northern Railway (GNR) by the time an Act of Parliament was obtained, but the original agreement was retained, and the GNR leased the Witham for 999 years for a payment of £10,545 per year to the proprietors. This figure represented the average profits for the previous three years, plus five per cent. The railway company also agreed to pay the interest on mortgages amounting to £24,692 which the proprietors held, but had redeemed them by 1857. The railway from Lincoln to Boston ran along the eastern bank of the river, and opened on 17 October 1848.

Most of the stations were located near to the landing stages which the steam packets used, and the railway did all it could to draw passengers away from the river. This included the provision of fourth-class carriages, with fares set at a halfpenny per mile, in 1850, and by 1863, the steam packet boats had ceased operation. Freight traffic also declined, with coal passing through the Grand Sluice dropping from 19,535 tons in 1847 to 3,780 tons in 1857. The GNR leased the navigation to the Great Northern and Great Eastern Joint Committee in 1882, and in 1897, by which time the Manchester, Sheffield and Lincolnshire Railway had become the Great Central Railway, they built a large warehouse beside Brayford Pool, with a transhipment dock next to it. Total traffic on the river had fallen to 18,548 tons in 1905, and averaged 5,870 tons during the years of the First World War, mainly general merchandise and agricultural produce. With the nationalisation of the waterways following the Second World War, the navigation eventually became the responsibility of British Waterways as a result of the Transport Act 1962, and since 2 July 2012 has been managed by the Canal & River Trust.

Current navigation
Today, commercial traffic, apart from tour boats, has ceased above the port of Boston (The Haven) and only pleasure craft carry on through the lock at the Grand Sluice into the Witham. Unlike many such sea locks, the reverse-facing gates close on every tide, as the normal high tide water level is higher than the level of the river, while at low tides there is insufficient water in the Haven to allow exit from the lock. Passage is therefore restricted to a brief period approximately two hours before or after high water. It is still possible to navigate many of the drains in small vessels, and a new lock, completed in December 2008, provides entry to the South Forty-Foot Drain from below the Grand Sluice so that vessels will be able to reach the Fens without venturing out to the Wash, as part of the Fens Waterways Link.

The Witham is navigable from Brayford Wharf in Lincoln to Boston. There are two locks between Boston and Lincoln – one at Bardney and the other in Lincoln itself, the Stamp End Lock which is unusually a guillotine lock. In times of flood it is unnavigable. It is the only British bridge which still has secular medieval buildings standing on it, and is believed to be the second oldest masonry arch bridge in the country. It is currently a Scheduled Ancient Monument and a Grade I Listed Building.

There are traffic lights on the short section between Brayford Pool and Stamp End Lock, which are used to indicate the state of the river in times of flood. Green indicates that flows are low or normal, and boats can proceed along this stretch. Red indicates that flows are high and that great care is required. Flashing red indicates that flows are very high and boats must not use the section.

Connecting waterways
There are a number of drains that connect to the River Witham and that are protected by flood doors. These consist of a single pair of mitre gates that are designed to close if the level in the river rises above the level in the drain. Several of these are navigable to the more adventurous boater. The river is also joined by the Kyme Eau, which connects to the Sleaford Navigation on which navigation will eventually be restored to Sleaford. At Antons Gowt, a lock drops down into the Witham Navigable Drains, a system of drainage ditches which are used to prevent flooding of the fens to the north of Boston. Since November 2008 there has been an active campaign by the Billinghay Skirth Regeneration Society to restore navigation on the River Skirth, and the project has won the support of Billinghay and other parish councils, the Inland Waterways Association, the Environment Agency, Lincolnshire County Council and the Lincolnshire Waterways Partnership.

Water quality
The Environment Agency measure the water quality of the river systems in England. Each is given an overall ecological status, which may be one of five levels: high, good, moderate, poor and bad. There are several components that are used to determine this, including biological status, which looks at the quantity and varieties of invertebrates, angiosperms and fish. Chemical status, which compares the concentrations of various chemicals against known safe concentrations, is rated good or fail.

The water quality of the River Witham system was as follows in 2019.

The reasons for the quality being less than good include sewage discharge affecting most of the river, physical modification of the channel for land drainage, and run-off from agricultural and rural land. Like many rivers in the UK, the chemical status changed from good to fail in 2019, due to the presence of polybrominated diphenyl ethers (PBDE), perfluorooctane sulphonate (PFOS) and mercury compounds, none of which had previously been included in the assessment.

In March 2018, the river suffered the worst incidence of pollution ever recorded in Lincolnshire, when Omex Agriculture released ammonia into the water. It resulted in over 100,000 fish dying between Bardney and the Wash, for which the company was given a remediation notice as defined by the Environmental Damage (Prevention and Remediation) Regulations 2015. They must carry out a range of improvements to the river to ensure that its habitat is restored. Once the ammonia had been flushed out, 1.5 million fish larvae and 70,000 roach and bream were released into the river. The remediation notice was only the second to be issued since the legislation was introduced.

Points of interest

Tributaries
 Foston Beck
 River Brant
 Fossdyke Navigation, a canalisation of the lower River Till
 Barlings Eau
 River Bain
 Kyme Eau, the fenland part of the River Slea
The following flow into The Haven:
 South Forty-Foot Drain
 Maud Foster Drain (part of Witham Navigable Drains)
 Hobhole Drain (part of Witham Navigable Drains)

See also
Kirkstead Bridge
Rivers of the United Kingdom
River Witham sword
Witham Navigable Drains
Witham First District IDB
Witham Third District IDB
Upper Witham IDB

References

Bibliography

Historical descriptions

ibid. First edition (1868)

External links

Photographs of the River Witham
Navigation information, Inland Waterways Association
Real-time water level data, Environment Agency

Rivers of Lincolnshire

nn:Witham